Marvin Lawrence Fleming (born January 2, 1942) is a former professional American football player, a tight end in the National Football League (NFL) for 12 seasons, seven with the Green Bay Packers and five with the Miami Dolphins. He was a member of five NFL championship teams.

Fleming is the first player in NFL history to play in five Super Bowls—with Green Bay (I, II) and Miami (VI, VII, VIII). He played under hall of fame head coaches Vince Lombardi and Don Shula for five seasons each.

Early years
Born in Longview, Texas, Fleming was raised in southern California in Compton and graduated from Compton High School. He played college football at the University of Utah in Salt Lake City under head coach Ray Nagel.

Playing career
Selected in the 11th round of the 1963 NFL draft by the two-time defending NFL champion Packers, Fleming won three consecutive NFL titles and the first two Super Bowls in Green Bay. After seven seasons, the last two under head coach Phil Bengtson, he signed with the Dolphins in May 1970. Fleming was with the Dolphins for five seasons (and three Super Bowls), then was traded to the Washington Redskins for running back Charley Harraway. He was in the Redskins' 1975 training camp under George Allen, but missed the final cut in September and retired.

Fleming was inducted into the Green Bay Packers Hall of Fame in 2010.

Personal
Fleming was the victim of an identity theft scam in the late 1970s and early 1980s. Arthur Lee Trotter posed as Fleming and was arrested in Texas in 1980 for selling phony stock in NFL teams. Caught, Trotter conceded to police that he was not Fleming: he said he was actually former Baltimore Colts star John Mackey.

Fleming and receiver Roy Jefferson (b.1943) are cousins less than two years apart and grew up together in Compton. They played football at Compton High School and college football at Utah. Both on offense, the two were on opposing teams in Super Bowl VII, Fleming on the Dolphins and Jefferson on the Redskins.

References

External links
 

1942 births
Living people
People from Longview, Texas
American football tight ends
Utah Utes football players
Green Bay Packers players
Miami Dolphins players